Ancient Chernihiv is the National Architecture-Historical Sanctuary located in the north-eastern Ukrainian city of Chernihiv. It was created at first as an affiliate of the National Sanctuary "Sophia of Kyiv". Since August 1, 1967, the site is a separate entity consisting of 34 monuments of architecture.

Architectural landmarks
 Dytynets Park of Chernihiv, also known as Chernihiv's motte (earthwork)
 Catherine's Church
 Krasna Square
 Pyatnytska Church
 Saviour-Transfiguration Cathedral
 Trinity Cathedral Monastery
 Boldyni Hory
 Black Grave (kurgan)
 Saint Anthony Caves
 Chernihiv Regional Art Museum
 Red Bridge
 Church of All Saints, Chernihiv
 Chernihiv's Collegium (see collegium)
 Pedestrian Bridge
 House of Lyzohub (Colonel of the Chernihiv's Regiment)
 Church of the Resurrection
 Archbishop's residence
 Museum of history
 Museum of Antiquities
 Church of the Archangel Michael
 Church of the Holy Spirit
 Borisoglebsky Cathedral
 Yelets-Dormition Monastery
 Chernihiv Glory Memorial
 Monument to Soldiers Liberators
 Victory Square
 Old Jewish Cemetery
 Old Cemetery, Chernihiv
 River Harbor
 Chernihiv Military History Museum

Since 1989, the site is placed on the tentative list of the United Nations Educational, Scientific and Cultural Organization (UNESCO) as part of "World Heritage", receiving its reference as number 668.

Gallery

See also
 List of historic reserves in Ukraine
 List of UNESCO World Heritage Sites in Ukraine

References

External links
  Official website
 Capital of Forest Empire, part I
 Capital of Forest Empire, part II
 Capital of Forest Empire, part III
 List of monuments of cultural heritage of Ukraine
 ЧЕРНІГІВСЬКИЙ ДЕРЖАВНИЙ АРХІТЕКТУРНО-ІСТОРИЧНИЙ  ЗАПОВІДНИК "ЧЕРНІГІВ СТАРОДАВНІЙ"
 Chernihiv Ancient at website of the Chernihiv Region State Administration

History of Chernihiv
Historic districts
Historic sites in Ukraine
Protected areas of Ukraine
Protected areas established in 1967
Buildings and structures in Chernihiv
Tourist attractions in Chernihiv Oblast